Ufuk Bayraktar (born 28 May 1988), better known by his stage name Ufo361, is a German rapper of Turkish descent from Berlin.

Early life
Bayraktar was born to Turkish parents in west Berlin and grew up in nearby Kreuzberg. He came in contact with hip hop at a young age and started as a sprayer in the THC-Crew. His stage name is derived from his first name, Ufuk, and his hometown Kreuzberg's postal code, 36/61.

Career 
In 2010, Bayraktar was signed to Hoodrich, a label founded by his friend Said. On 7 October 2011, their first sampler was released. Together with Said and producer KD-Supier, they formed the trio Bellini Boyz. 

In 2012, he released his first EP Bald ist dein Geld meins. His first studio album, Ihr seid nicht allein, was released in August 2014.

Ufo's first hit was the single "Ich bin ein Berliner", released in September 2015 in support for his first mixtape of the same name. Referring to John F. Kennedy's famous speech Ich bin ein Berliner, the single became a viral hit in Germany and was shared by famous rappers, including the 187 Strassenbande, Haftbefehl and Fler. "Ich bin ein Berliner" was released on 25 March 2016 and peaked at number 57 on the German album-charts. 

Less than eight months later, Ufo361 released Ich bin 2 Berliner which peaked on 13 on the German albums chart. His first major success was his third mixtape Ich bin 3 Berliner, released in April 2017, which spawned several singles including "Mister T", "Für die Gang", "Der Pate" and "James Dean". 

In April 2017, he founded his own record label, Stay High. In mid-December 2017, he announced his second studio album 808, which was released in April 2018. The album debuted at number one of the German and Austrian albums charts. His third studio album, VVS, was announced in June 2018 and was released on 17 August 2018. 

In 2019, Ufo361 signed 15-year-old newcomer Data Luv and released his fourth studio album Wave on 9 August.

Discography 

 Ihr seid nicht allein (2014)
 Ich bin ein Berliner (2016)
 Ich bin 2 Berliner (2016)
 Ich bin 3 Berliner (2017)
 808 (2018)
 VVS (2018)
 Wave (2019)
 Lights Out (2019)
 Rich Rich (2020)
 Nur für dich (2020)
 Stay High (2021)
 Destroy All Copies (2021)

References

1988 births
Living people
German rappers
German lyricists
Musicians from Berlin
German people of Turkish descent
German songwriters